Mario Carotenuto (30 June 1916 – 14 April 1995) was an Italian actor of film and theatre.

Biography

Carotenuto, the son of a silent film actor and younger brother of the actor Memmo Carotenuto, took various humble jobs for many years before starting his own artistic career in 1946, first as a radio actor and then joining small avanspettacolo companies. He made his film debut in 1950, in Abbiamo vinto, going on to perform as leading or supporting actor in dozens of films, often comedies. He was also very active on stage and television.

He died in Rome in 1995.

Awards
 1973 Nastro d'argento for best Supporting Actor for the film Lo scopone scientifico

Filmography
 
 Scipione l'africano (1937)
 The Two Sergeants (1951)
 Milano miliardaria (1951)
 Beauties in Capri (1952)
 The Beach (1954)
 A Hero of Our Times (1955)
 Sunset in Naples (1955)
 Kean: Genius or Scoundrel (1956)
 I giorni più belli (1956)
 Mio figlio Nerone (1956)
 L'amore nasce a Roma (1958)
 Move and I'll Shoot (1958)
 First Love (1959)
 Ragazzi del Juke-Box (1959)
 The Friend of the Jaguar (1959)
 Fountain of Trevi (1960)
 Totò, Eva e il pennello proibito (1959)
 Il Mantenuto (1961)
 5 marines per 100 ragazze (1962)
 La Vendetta (1962)
 Destination Rome (1963)
     L Insegnante (1965)
 Satyricon (1969)
 If It's Tuesday, This Must Be Belgium (1969)
 1870 (1971)
 I due assi del guantone (1971)
 Boccaccio (1972)
 When Women Were Called Virgins (1972)
 Lo scopone scientifico (1972)
 Pasqualino Cammarata, Frigate Captain (1974)
 Febbre da cavallo (1975)
 Per favore, occupati di Amelia (1981)
 Pierino medico della Saub (1981)
 Cuando calienta el sol... vamos a la playa (1982)
 Gian Burrasca (1982)
 Paulo Roberto Cotechiño centravanti di sfondamento (1983)

References

External links
 

1916 births
1995 deaths
Male actors from Rome
Italian male film actors
Nastro d'Argento winners
20th-century Italian male actors
Italian male stage actors
Italian male television actors